Exaceae is a flowering plant tribe in the family Gentianaceae.
Exaceae comprises about 180 species assigned to eight monophyletic
genera, with major centres of endemism in
continental Africa (about 78 endemic species and two endemic
genera), Madagascar (55 endemic species and four endemic
genera) and the southern tip of India and Sri Lanka
(14 endemic species).

Genera
 Exacum L. (syn. Cotylanthera Blume)
 Exochaenium Griseb.
 Gentianothamnus Humbert
 Klackenbergia Kissling
 Lagenias E. Mey.
 Ornichia Klack.
 Sebaea Sol. ex R. Br. (syn. Belmontia)
 Tachiadenus Griseb.

References

Asterid tribes
Gentianaceae